Necrodaemon Terrorsathan is the third studio album by the Austrian blackened death metal band Belphegor.

Pope John Paul II is implicitly referenced in one line of the lyrics to the track "Cremation of Holiness".

Track listing
All music composed and lyrics written by Helmuth Lehner and Sigurd Hagenauer.

 "Necrodaemon Terrorsathan" – 4:48
 "Vomit upon the Cross" – 4:11
 "Diabolical Possession" – 4:49
 "Lust Perishes in a Thirst for Blood" – 3:53
 "S.B.S.R." – 4:00
 "Sadism Unbound / Lechery on the Altar" – 3:34
 "Tanzwut Totengesänge" – 3:18
 "Cremation of Holiness" – 3:40
 "Necrodaemon Terrorsathan Pt. II / Analjesus (Outro)" – 3:16

Personnel
Belphegor
Helmuth Lehner – vocals, guitars
Sigurd Hagenauer – guitars
Mario "Marius" Klausner – bass, vocals

Additional musicians
Man Gandler – drums
Günther "Gü" Wutzl – synthesizer

Production
Boban Milunovic – producer, mastering
Reinhard Brunner – mastering
Karl-Heinz Schuster – layout
Joe Wimmer – photography
 Recorded at Noise Art Studios in Wels, Austria in October 1999 – February 2000.
 Mastered at ATS Studio in Mölln, Austria.

References

  

Belphegor albums
2000 albums
German-language albums